A commodities exchange is an exchange, or market, where various commodities are traded. Most commodity markets around the world trade in agricultural products and other raw materials (like wheat, barley, sugar, maize, cotton, cocoa, coffee, milk products, pork bellies, oil, and metals). Trading includes and various types of derivatives contracts based on these commodities, such as forwards, futures and options, as well as spot trades (for immediate delivery).

A futures contract provides that an agreed quantity and quality of the commodity will be delivered at some agreed future date. A farmer raising corn can sell a futures contract on his corn, which will not be harvested for several months, and gets a guarantee of the price he will be paid when he delivers; a breakfast cereal producer buys the contract and gets a guarantee that the price will not go up when it is delivered. This protects the farmer from price drops and the buyer from price rises. Speculators and investors also buy and sell these contracts to try to make a profit; they provide liquidity to the system.

Some of these exchanges also trade financial derivatives, such as interest rate and foreign exchange futures, as well as other instruments such as ocean freight contracts and environmental instruments. In some cases these are mentioned in the lists below.

Major commodity exchanges 

 Chicago Board of Trade
 Chicago Mercantile Exchange
 New York Mercantile Exchange

Commodities exchanges across the world
Main commodity exchanges worldwide:

Africa

Americas

Asia

Europe

Oceania

See also
Commodity market
Commodity trading in private electronic markets
List of futures exchanges
List of traded commodities

References

Agricultural economics
Mineral economics